In Mandaeism, Manda d-Hayyi or Manda ḏ-Hiia is an uthra (angel or guardian) sent by the Great Life (Hayyi Rabbi, or the Transcendent God) as a messenger to John the Baptist. Manda d-Hayyi is considered to be the most important uthra, since he is the one bringing manda (knowledge or gnosis) to Earth (Tibil).

In Mandaean texts
In Book 5, Chapter 4 of the Right Ginza, Manda d-Hayyi appears to John the Baptist as a "small boy aged three years and one day." John the Baptist baptizes the small boy, after which John is taken up to the World of Light (see also the Coptic Apocalypse of Paul, in which a little boy appears to Paul the Apostle, who is then taken up to heaven). Also, in Book 8 of the Right Ginza, Manda d-Hayyi warns the faithful against the dangers of Ruha.

In the Mandaean Book of John and Book 3 of the Right Ginza, Manda d-Hayyi makes a journey into the World of Darkness (underworld), where he meets Gaf and other demons and triumphs against them.

Manda d-Hayyi is sometimes portrayed as harbouring a grudge against Yushamin. In the eighth chapter of the Book of John, Manda d-Hayyi opposes a petition to the King of Light for forgiveness for Yushamin brought by Yushamin's son Nṣab Ziwa, and is rebuked by the King of Light for hating Yushamin due to Yushamin having refused him a wife from his family.

In some Mandaean texts, he is also referred to as Yuzaṭaq Manda d-Hayyi. E. S. Drower suggests that "male Holy Spirit" as a probable meaning for Yuzaṭaq.

Relationship to Hibil

E. S. Drower notes in an appendix to her translation of the Diwan Abatur that Manda d-Hayyi and Hibil Ziwa are sometimes identified with one another, although they are considered separate figures in the Diwan Abatur. Manda d-Hayyi is sometimes named as Hibil's father; elsewhere, Hayyi Rabbi is.

The ritual passages in the Diwan Masbuta d-Hibil Ziwa describe Hibil as Manda d-Hayyi's son and include Manda d-Hayyi amongst those officiating in Hibil's baptism. However, the same scroll's account of Hibil's descent to the World of Darkness refers to "Hibil-Ziwa" when he is being commanded to descend, switches to referring to "Manda" or "Manda-ḏ-Hiia" while he is in the World of Darkness, and back to referring to "Hibil-Ziwa" when he is seeking to be able to ascend back to the World of Light; furthermore, Manda d-Hayyi is then summoned within the World of Light to send a letter of Kushta to his son Hibil to aid the latter's ascent. Drower notes "read "Hibil" for "Manda"" in a footnote in her translation, and inserts "(Hibil-Ziwa son of)" as a differentiated inline annotation where appropriate.

Weapons
According to the Right Ginza, the weapons of Manda d-Hayyi are:
Radiance and Light (Ziwa u Nhūra)
a great attire
the margna (staff) of Living Water (Mia Hayya)
the wreath of the Living Flame (ʿŠata Haita)
the armor of the Great Ones
a mace (club)
a veil (or a net?)
a robe of the Great Ones

See also

Manda (Mandaeism)
Divine spark
Manda (goddess)
List of angels in theology

References

Individual angels
Uthras
Primordial teachers
Personifications in Mandaeism